Tacuarembovum is an oogenus of fossil egg from the Late Cretaceous (Campanian to Maastrichtian) Asencio Formation of Uruguay. It represents an Elongatoolithid, and pending future analysis may be found to be synonymous with another oospecies.

References 

Dinosaur reproduction
Campanian life
Maastrichtian life
Late Cretaceous dinosaurs of South America
Cretaceous Uruguay
Fossils of Uruguay
Fossil parataxa described in 1980